Bielsko is a former town in southern Poland, now part of Bielsko-Biała.

Bielsko may also refer to:
Bielsko County (powiat bielski)
Bielsko, Lublin Voivodeship (east Poland)
Bielsko, Międzychód County in Greater Poland Voivodeship (west-central Poland)
Bielsko, Słupca County in Greater Poland Voivodeship (west-central Poland)
Bielsko, Pomeranian Voivodeship (north Poland)